Schwartziella bryerea is a species of minute sea snail, a marine gastropod mollusk or micromollusk in the family Zebinidae.

Distribution
This species occurs in the Caribbean Sea, the Gulf of Mexico and the Lesser Antilles and in the Atlantic Ocean along Florida, Brazil, Ascension Island and Saint Helena.

Description 
The maximum recorded shell length is 5.8 mm.

Habitat 
Minimum recorded depth is 0 m. Maximum recorded depth is 34 m.

References

Further reading 
 Smith E. A. (1890) Report on the marine molluscan fauna of the island of St. Helena. Proceedings of the Zoological Society of London (1890): 247–317, pl 21–24. [August 1890] page(s): 287, pl. 23 fig. 36 
 Rosenberg, G., F. Moretzsohn, and E. F. García. 2009. Gastropoda (Mollusca) of the Gulf of Mexico, Pp. 579–699 in Felder, D.L. and D.K. Camp (eds.), Gulf of Mexico–Origins, Waters, and Biota. Biodiversity. Texas A&M Press, College Station, Texas.
 Rolán E. & Fernández-Garcés R. (2010) The shouldered species of the Rissoininae (Mollusca: Rissooidea) in the Caribbean with the description of three new species. Novapex 11(4): 83–91. page(s): 87.

External links
 

bryerea
Gastropods described in 1803
Molluscs of the Atlantic Ocean
Molluscs of Brazil
Fauna of Ascension Island
Fauna of Saint Helena